Wolfgang Blankenau (born April 28, 1955, in Edmonton) is a former Canadian handball player who competed in the 1976 Summer Olympics.

He was part of the Canadian handball team, which finished eleventh in the 1976 Olympic tournament. He played all five matches and scored twelve goals.

References
 profile

1955 births
Living people
Canadian male handball players
Olympic handball players of Canada
Handball players at the 1976 Summer Olympics
Sportspeople from Edmonton